Ruda-Huta  is a village in Chełm County, Lublin Voivodeship, in eastern Poland, close to the border with Ukraine. It is the seat of the gmina (administrative district) called Gmina Ruda-Huta.

The village has a population of 1,076.

References

Villages in Chełm County